Klaus Viktor Darga (born 24 February 1934) is a German chess grandmaster.

Chess career
In 1951, Darga became German Junior Champion after winning the national under-20 championship. He also proved his strength as a young chess player by sharing first place in the World Junior Championship of 1953, with Oscar Panno of Argentina who was awarded the title on tiebreak. He won the West German Chess Championship in 1955 and 1961. He came second in the Gijón international tournament in 1956.His best performance is held to be the 1967 Winnipeg tournament, where he also tied for first place with Bent Larsen, whom he beat, ahead of joint Boris Spassky and Paul Keres.

He was awarded the title of International Master in 1957, and Grandmaster in 1964. He played for West Germany in ten Olympiads between 1954 and 1978, and also served as coach of the German national team.  He was second reserve for the World team in the 1970 Match of the Century between the Soviet Union and the rest of the world, but did not play any games in the match.

His favourite openings as White were the English Opening and the Ruy Lopez. As Black he often played the Sicilian Defence.

Notable games
Klaus Darga vs Boris Spassky, 1964 Interzonal

Personal life
After his retirement as a chess professional, Darga became a computer programmer for IBM.

References

 Edward R. Brace (1977), An Illustrated Dictionary of Chess, London: Hamlyn Publishing.

External links
 
 

1934 births
Chess grandmasters
German chess players
Chess coaches
National team coaches
IBM employees
Sportspeople from Berlin
Living people